Down Under is a colloquialism which refers to Australia. 

Down Under may also refer to:

 "Down Under" (song), by Australian rock band Men at Work
 Down Under (album), an album by Bill Cosby
 Down Under (book), a 2000 travelogue about Australia by Bill Bryson
 Down Under (1927 film), a film directed by Harry Southwell
 Down Under (2016 film), an Australian film starring Damon Herriman
 "Down under", a euphemism for genitalia
"Down Under", a song by Blonde Redhead from La Mia Vita Violenta

See also
 Down Under Bowl, a high-school American football tournament in Australia
 Tour Down Under and Down Under Classic, a road cycling races in Australia